The men's shot put event at the 1990 World Junior Championships in Athletics was held in Plovdiv, Bulgaria, at Deveti Septemvri Stadium on 10 and 11 August.  A 7257g (Senior implement) shot was used.

Medalists

Results

Final
11 August

Qualifications
10 Aug

Group A

Participation
According to an unofficial count, 20 athletes from 15 countries participated in the event.

References

Shot put
Shot put at the World Athletics U20 Championships